Enhydrina schistosa, commonly known as the beaked sea snake, hook-nosed sea snake,  common sea snake, or the Valakadeyan sea snake, is a highly venomous species of sea snake common throughout the tropical Indo-Pacific. This species is implicated in more than 50% of all bites caused by sea snakes, as well as the majority of envenomings and fatalities.

Description
The rostral scale is longer than broad, and is in contact with four shields; frontal more long than broad, shorter than the parietals; nasals in contact with the two anterior labials; sometimes partially divided; one pre- and one or two postoculars; temporals l–3; seven or eight upper labials, fourth or third and fourth entering the eye, the last sometimes divided; anterior chin-shields rather indistinct, separated. Scales with a tubercle or keel, in 50–70 rows; ventrals 230–314, slightly enlarged. The snake is usually uniformly dark grey above; sides and lower parts whitish. Young specimens olive or grey with black transverse bands, broadest in the middle. Length of head and body 1110 mm; tail 190 mm.

The name valakadyn is from the Malayalam and Tamil word Vala kadiyan meaning net biter.

Distribution
It is found in the Arabian Sea and Persian Gulf (Bahrain, Iran, Iraq, Kuwait, Oman, Qatar, Saudi Arabia and United Arab Emirates), south of the Seychelles and Madagascar, the seas off South Asia (Pakistan, India (coasts from Gujarat to West Bengal and Andaman & Nicobar Island), Sri Lanka and Bangladesh), Southeast Asia (Myanmar, Thailand, Vietnam).

Snakes from Australia (Northern Territory and Queensland) and New Guinea are now provisionally identified as Enhydrina zweifeli, due to DNA tests that have shown they are not related to Enhydrina schistosa.

Habitat and behavior 
These snakes are generally found in the coast and coastal islands of India. They are amongst the most common of the 20 kinds of sea snakes found in that region.

They are active both during the day and at night. They are able to dive up to 100 m and stay underwater for a maximum of five hours before resurfacing. Sea snakes are equipped with glands to eliminate excess salt. They are venomous and notably aggressive, with some herpetologists describing them as "cantankerous and savage".  About 1.5 milligrams of its venom is estimated to be lethal

Their principal food is fish.

Venom
The venom of this species is made up of highly potent neurotoxins and myotoxins.  This widespread species is responsible for the vast majority of deaths from sea snake bites (up to 90% of all sea snake bites). The  value is 0.1125 mg/kg based on toxicology studies. The average venom yield per bite is approximately 7.9–9.0 mg, while the lethal human dose is estimated to be 1.5 mg.

References 
Footnotes

Bibliography

 Heatwole, H. (1999). Sea Snakes. New South Wales: University of New South Wales Press.
 Voris, Harold K. (1985). "Population size estimates for a marine snake (Enhydrina schistosa) in Malaysia." Copeia 1985 (4): 955–961

External links 

 
 The Reptile House

schistosa
Fauna of Iran
Reptiles of Pakistan
Reptiles described in 1803